Miriam Rodríguez Gallego is a Spanish singer, songwriter and actress best known for taking part in the ninth series of Operación Triunfo, in which she finished in third place behind runner-up Aitana and winner Amaia. After the show ended, she was signed alongside the other contestants by Universal Music.

Career

Early years
Miriam started out as a wedding singer and performing concerts in small halls and bars in Galicia. She took part in several local and regional talent contests across Galicia, including the 2013 edition of Canta Ferrol, which she won. In 2016, she released her debut single, Me cansé de esperar, with Chechu Salgado, and also played a small part in TVG series Serramoura.

Operación Triunfo and Eurovision Song Contest bid (2017-2018)
In October 2017, she was announced as one of the 18 selected contestants for the opening gala of the ninth series of Operación Triunfo. After performing No te pude retener (originally by Vanesa Martín) she was among the 16 contestants granted a spot in the show's academy. Throughout the series' run, the jury nominated her to leave the academy four times, but she would be saved either by the academy staff or the other contestants' vote, meaning she never was directly up for elimination. In the final, held on 5 February 2018, Miriam performed Malú's Invisible to advance to the second round, in which the top 3 contestants (herself, Aitana and Amaia) had to reprise their respective Gala 0 songs. After the voting window closed, it was announced that she had finished in third place after receiving only 12% of the votes from the viewers.

Performances on Operación Triunfo

Eurovision Song Contest national final

All five Operación Triunfo finalists were designated as candidates to represent Spain in the Eurovision Song Contest 2018. She was allocated three songs: Camina, a group song with the rest of the finalists, Magia, a duet with Agoney (which turned him into the only non-finalist in the running), and solo track Lejos de tu piel. None of her entries made it past the first voting round in the national final, held on 29 January 2018.

After Operación Triunfo (2018-present)
In April 2018, she released her first post-OT single, Hay algo en mí, which would be featured in the soundtrack of the third season of Fox series Vis a vis. In 2019, she made a cameo in the series' fourth and final season. In 2019, she was confirmed as adviser to Pablo López for the Knockout and Final Battle rounds of the sixth series of La Voz.

Discography

Studio albums

Singles

Filmography

Television

References

External links

1996 births
Living people
People from O Eume
Operación Triunfo contestants
21st-century Spanish singers
21st-century Spanish women singers